USC&GS Arago was a steamer that served as a survey ship in the United States Coast Survey from 1871 to 1878 and in the United States Coast and Geodetic Survey from 1878 to 1890. She was the second ship of the Coast Survey or Coast and Geodetic Survey to bear the name.

Arago was built by Maury and Steinburg at New York City in 1871. She did survey work along the Atlantic coast of the United States throughout her career.

When the Coast Survey was reorganized in 1878 to form the Coast and Geodetic Survey, Arago became a part of the new service.

From 1871 until 1881, she was one of two ships in Coast Survey and Coast and Geodetic Survey named Arago, the other being Arago of 1854.

Arago was sold to the United States Lighthouse Service in 1890.

References
NOAA History, A Science Odyssey: Tools of the Trade: Ships: Coast and Geodetic Survey Ships: Arago

Ships of the United States Coast and Geodetic Survey
Survey ships of the United States
Ships built in New York City
1871 ships
Ships of the United States Lighthouse Service